Mercer County Senior High School is a public secondary school located in Harrodsburg, Kentucky, United States.

Establishment
In May 2006, the Harrodsburg Independent School District and the Mercer County School District voted to consolidate with each other.  The Harrodsburg District voted 4-1 and the Mercer County District voted 5-0.  Due to the merger, Mercer County High School and Harrodsburg High School merged to form the new Mercer County Senior High School. The school was chartered in the 2006-2007 school year.    
In 2014, the school expanded its campus to include the 9th Grade, which formerly attended a separate building known as the Freshman Academy.

Athletics 
Several sports are offered at MCSHS including:

Baseball
Boys' Basketball
Boys' Golf
Boys' Soccer
Boys' Tennis
Boys' Track
Cross Country
Football
Girls' Basketball
Girls' Golf
Girls' Tennis
Girls' Track
Softball
Volleyball

Football

In 2006, the football team won the KHSAA Class 2A State Championship under head coach Marty Jaggers. Even though the team consisted of two combined squads from the original Mercer County High and Harrodsburg High, the 2006 squad was allowed to compete in Class 2A because it was too late to alter football schedules for that season. The following year, the school moved to Class 5A to reflect its merger with Harrodsburg High School.

Band

The band won Class AA State Championships in 2005 and 2006 under the direction of Jeffrey Meadows. The squad returned to the state finals (4A) in 2008 and 2009, and finished fourth overall.

Clubs 
Several Clubs are offered at MCSHS including:

4-H Club
Art Club
Beta Club
Book Club
Drama Club
FCA
FCCLA
FFA
HOSA
ITS
Key Club
NHS
Poetry Club
Music Club
Republican Club
Chess Club
Y-Club
Pep Club

References

External links 
 
 Mercer County Schools

Public high schools in Kentucky
Schools in Mercer County, Kentucky
2006 establishments in Kentucky
Harrodsburg, Kentucky